Helicon is a small lunar impact crater that is located on the north part of the Mare Imbrium. The crater was named after 4th century BC Greek astronomer Helicon of Cyzicus, a friend and disciple of Plato. To the northwest is the prominent Sinus Iridum, a mountain-ringed bay on the mare. Just to the east is the slightly smaller crater Le Verrier.

Helicon is a nearly circular formation with inner walls that curve down to a relatively flat floor. There is a tiny craterlet located at the midpoint of the interior, and a small craterlet along the southwestern rim.

Satellite craters
According to convention these features are identified on lunar maps by placing the letter on the side of the crater midpoint that is closest to Helicon.

References

External links

 , excellent earth-based image of Sinus Iridum and vicinity, including Helicon and Le Verrier

Impact craters on the Moon
Mare Imbrium